Reserve is an unincorporated community in St. John the Baptist Parish, Louisiana, United States. It is located on the east bank of the Mississippi River. The population was 9,111 at the 2000 census. For statistical purposes, the United States Census Bureau has defined Reserve as a census-designated place (CDP).

History 
Prior to the name Reserve, this town was once called Bonnet Carre; the town name had been changed by businessman and resident Leon Godchaux by the late 1800s. The Godchaux–Reserve Plantation was built by Leon Godchaux, and the oldest portion of the plantation home dates to 1764, is listed on the National Register of Historic Places (NRHP). In the early 20th century, the plantation at Reserve had the largest sugarcane refinery in the United States, named Godchaux Sugar Refinery.

President William Howard Taft visited Reserve and the Godchaux–Reserve Plantation in 1909, while President Gerald Ford visited Reserve in 1976.

In addition, in 2005 Our Lady of Grace Catholic Church, which dates back to 1937, is listed on the National Register of Historic Places. Our Lady of Grace was built to serve the needs of the African American Catholic Community.

Pontchartrain Works
In 2015, the United States Environmental Protection Agency reported findings of the existence of an extremely high risk of cancer in the region and noted that Reserve was the epicenter of the area of high risk for cancer. The agency identified releases of the chemical compound chloroprene as responsible for the high risk. 

This chemical compound was being released from the Pontchartrain Works facility, a manufacturing facility owned and operated for decades by DuPont and sold in 2015 to Denka of Japan. The facility is the only producer of the chemical in the United States.

Geography
Reserve is located at  (30.062566, -90.553296).

According to the United States Census Bureau, the CDP has a total area of 17.1 square miles (44.3 km), of which 16.1 square miles (41.6 km) is land and 1.0 square mile (2.7 km) (6.13%) is water.

Demographics

As of the 2020 United States census, there were 8,541 people, 3,232 households, and 2,246 families residing in the CDP. As of the census of 2000, there were 9,111 people, 3,068 households, and 2,347 families residing in the CDP. The racial makeup of the CDP was 44.17% White, 53.92% African American, 0.19% Native American, 0.32% Asian, 0.02% Pacific Islander, 0.60% from other races, and 0.78% from two or more races. Hispanic or Latino of any race were 1.98% of the population.

There were 3,068 households, out of which 41.5% had children under the age of 18 living with them, 48.6% were married couples living together, 22.2% had a female householder with no husband present, and 23.5% were non-families. 20.8% of all households were made up of individuals, and 8.1% had someone living alone who was 65 years of age or older. The average household size was 2.97 and the average family size was 3.45.

In the CDP, the population was spread out, with 32.2% under the age of 18, 10.4% from 18 to 24, 28.6% from 25 to 44, 19.3% from 45 to 64, and 9.5% who were 65 years of age or older. The median age was 31 years. For every 100 females, there were 90.9 males. For every 100 females age 18 and over, there were 85.1 males.

The median income for a household in the CDP was $32,466, and the median income for a family was $40,191. Males had a median income of $33,297 versus $19,671 for females. The per capita income for the CDP was $13,373. About 18.4% of families and 21.5% of the population were below the poverty line, including 30.8% of those under age 18 and 15.0% of those age 65 or over.

Education
The St. John the Baptist Parish School Board operates public schools in the community. Two K-8 schools serve separate areas that have Reserve addresses:
East St. John Elementary School
Fifth Ward Elementary School

High schools:
 East St. John High School in Reserve serves the community.

Private schools:
 Riverside Academy is a small private school in Reserve.

St. Peter Catholic School of the Roman Catholic Archdiocese of New Orleans is a K-7 Catholic school. Our Lady of Grace School was a Catholic K-7 school in Reserve. It closed in 2015; it had 171 students remaining, with about 51 having taken advantage of a Louisiana school voucher regime. There were two graduating classes in 2015.

Notable people
Jared Butler, NCAA basketball player for the Baylor Bears, MVP of the 2021 Final Four
Demond "Tweety" Carter, former basketball player at Baylor
Rico Gathers, NFL Football player with the Dallas Cowboys and former College Basketball player at Baylor University
Edmond Hall, jazz clarinet player and bandleader
Herb Hall, jazz clarinet player
Ryan Perrilloux, Quarterback for Louisiana State University, Jacksonville State and New York Giants
Patrick Lewis, professional football player for Seattle Seahawks; collegiate player at Texas A&M
Kid Thomas Valentine, jazz trumpeter and bandleader

References

External links
 Godchaux-Reserve House Historical Society

Census-designated places in Louisiana
Census-designated places in St. John the Baptist Parish, Louisiana
Census-designated places in New Orleans metropolitan area
Louisiana populated places on the Mississippi River